Wyldfire is a location-based dating application available on iOS. It was founded by San Diego-based Andrew White and Brian Freeman in 2014, and was inspired by Tinder.

The app was designed to create a better environment for women online by giving them control over which men join the network. All men who join are approved by a female member, and chat between members is limited to 20 messages. Five of the company's 11-member launch team are women and the site was backed by $150,000 in angel funding.

The company's first marketing message centered on a "ditch the creeps," movement supported by a humorous YouTube video.

References

External links
Wyldfire Homepage
Online Dating

Online dating services of the United States
Geosocial networking
Mobile social software
Computer-related introductions in 2014